Chris Freeland (born January 7, 1969) is an American politician from Kentucky. He is a Republican and represents District 6 in the State House.

References 

1969 births
Living people
Republican Party members of the Kentucky House of Representatives
21st-century American politicians